Solar tower may refer to:

 Solar tower (astronomy), a structure used to support equipment for studying the sun
 Solar flower tower, a hybrid power generator
 Solar power tower, a type of solar furnace using a tower to receive the focused sunlight
 Solar updraft tower, a concept for a power plant that generates electricity from low temperature solar heat
 Solar chimney, a vertical shaft using solar energy to enhance ventilation
 Solar furnace, a structure that uses concentrated solar power to produce high temperatures, usually for industry
 STACEE, Solar Tower Atmospheric Cherenkov Effect Experiment, to study Cherenkov radiation
 Solar (room), a room in many English and French medieval manor houses